Neo Trans is a transportation company operating the Shinbundang Line & the EverLine station facilities. Shinbundang line's train station facilities are operated by a company of the same name - Shinbundang Line. The company currently belongs to Doosan Group. A disposal of Neo Trans was proposed, but it was canceled.

See also 
Shinbundang Line
Bundang Line

References

External links 

 

2005 establishments in South Korea